William W. Donham (August 21, 1918 – April 15, 1998) was a member of the Ohio House of Representatives.

References

1918 births
Members of the Ohio House of Representatives
1988 deaths
20th-century American politicians
People from Middletown, Ohio